The 2010–11 Czech 2. Liga was the 18th season of the 2. česká fotbalová liga, the second tier of the Czech football league. The season began on 30 July 2010 and ended on 11 June 2011. The winter break was scheduled between 6 November 2010 and 5 March 2011.

FK Dukla Prague secured the 2. Liga title on 27 May 2011. Viktoria Žižkov were confirmed as the second team to gain promotion to the Czech First League on 4 June 2011. Hlučín, finishing last, were the first team to be relegated. Kladno were relegated in 15th position, their second consecutive relegation, on 4 June 2011.

Team changes

From 2. Liga
Promoted to Czech First League
 FC Hradec Králové
 FK Ústí nad Labem

Relegated to Moravian-Silesian Football League
 FC Vítkovice
 SFC Opava

To 2. Liga
Relegated from Czech First League
 SK Kladno
 FC Bohemians

Promoted from Bohemian Football League
 FK Spartak MAS Sezimovo Ústí
 SK Slovan Varnsdorf

Promoted from Moravian-Silesian Football League
 1. SC Znojmo

Notes

Team overview

League table

Results

Top goalscorers
Final standings.

See also
 2010–11 Czech First League
 2010–11 Czech Cup

References

Czech 2. Liga seasons
Czech
2010–11 in Czech football